Aleksandr Igorevich Kots (born 3 September 1978) is a Russian journalist, editor and propagandist. He reports mostly for tabloid newspaper Komsomolskaya Pravda and on his own channel on Telegram.

Biography 
Kots was born in Yuzhno-Sakhalinsk. His father, journalist Igor Kots, was from 2003 to 2013 the editor-in-chief and general director of the publication Sovetsky Sport. A month after the birth, Alexander's family moved to Khabarovsk in Russia's far east. He started school, then continued his studies in Vladivostok.

In 1993, Kots moved to Moscow, where he graduated from high school and studied at university. From 1996 to 1998, he did his military service in the 38th separate communications regiment of the Russian Airborne Forces, in the Moscow region, military unit 64164. After the army, he continued his studies.Since 1999, Kots has worked for Komsomolskaya Pravda, becoming a special correspondent for the political department. He is responsible for coverage of military conflicts and natural disasters in Russia and other countries, broadcasting on radio "Komsomolskaya Pravda".

As a war correspondent, Kots has covered events and military operations in Kosovo (2000, 2008 and 2011), Afghanistan (2006, 2013), the North Caucasus, Egypt (January-February 2011, 2012, 2013), Libya (several trips in 2011), Syria (several trips in 2012-2013 and 2015-2017), Iraq (2016) and Ukraine.

On May 9, 2004, when the President of the Chechen Republic, Akhmad Kadyrov was killed as a result of a terrorist attack at a stadium in Grozny, Kots suffered a concussion. On September 3, 2004, during a trip to Beslan, together with Russian special services, he participated in the evacuation of hostage children from the Beslan school siege. Together with his colleague Dmitry Steshin, he prepared material for the 20th anniversary of the accident at the Chernobyl Nuclear Power Plant, and lived for several days in the ghost city of Pripyat .

In June 2006, along with other journalists, in Feodosia (Crimea), Kots covered the actions of the local population against NATO and the US-Ukrainian exercises "Sea Breeze". At the same time, he personally actively protested against the presence of NATO troops in Crimea, taking part in the illegal hoisting of the flag of the Russian Federation on the roof of the building of the military sanatorium of the Ministry of Defense of Ukraine in Yevpatoriya.

On August 9, 2008, Kots went to the Tskhinvali District to cover the events of the Russo-Georgian War. While reporting from here, he sustained shrapnel wounds in his right arm and leg. On January 16, 2009 he was awarded with the medal "For Courage" for this trip. In 2010, Kots broadcast reports from the Port-au-Prince Cathedral in Haiti, which was destroyed by an earthquake. During the Arab Spring in April 2011, he was captured while covering the war in Libya, together with his colleague Dmitry Steshin and three journalists from the Russian NTV channel. The reporters were accused of being intelligence agents working for Muammar Gaddafi's regime. All reporters were released with the help of the Italian military stationed at the Benghazi airfield.

In 2016, Kots reported from Syria. In April 2016 he was awarded by Russian Minister of defense with Medal of Participant of military operation in Syria. In October-November 2016, he was one of the few Russian journalists covering the attack on Mosul by Iraqi troops and American special forces.

Serker Yakubkhanov, a journalist for the newspaper Current Time, has stated that there were nationalist and xenophobic motives in Kots's materials about the Caucasus.

In January-February 2019, Kots covered protests and unrest in Venezuela. In 2020, Kots was in Nagorno-Karabakh, covering the conflict between Armenia and Azerbaijan.

Ukraine
Since the beginning of Russian invasion to Ukraine in 2014, Kots has been covering the war, mostly in Donbas. He has done so without official accreditation from Ukraine. In early 2014, Kots worked with Dmitry Steshin, in Sloviansk. After Ukrainian forces took back Sloviansk, Kots and Steshin relocated to Donetsk.  Kots has repeatedly been accused of biased and unconfirmed information in his reports.  

Since the full-scale Russian invasion, in 2022, Kots has been actively covering the situation in Ukraine, with a pro-Kremlin bias. Commenting on Bucha massacre Kots denied responsibility of Russian troops, and accused the Ukrainian side of staging all the events.

The Security Service of Ukraine banned Kots from entering Ukraine “due to violation of the law on the status of foreigners and stateless persons”. In May 2022 he was sanctioned  by Great Britain and later by Australia. 

Kots often wears a military uniform without the special "PRESS" insignia, which violates the law of war and Geneva Conventions.

See also 

 Semen Pegov
 Anatoly Shariy
 Alexander Sladkov
 Dmitry Steshin 
 Russian information war against Ukraine

References 

Living people
1978 births

21st-century Russian journalists

People from Yuzhno-Sakhalinsk
Russian propagandists